Zoltán Szélesi (born 22 November 1981) is a Hungarian former professional footballer who played as a defender. He is the assistant coach of the Hungary national team.

Career
After being released by French club RC Strasbourg Szélesi signed for Hungarian champions Debreceni VSC in August 2009.

Career statistics

Club

International

Honours
Debrecen
 Nemzeti Bajnokság I: 2009–10
 Ligakupa: 2009–10

Újpest
 Magyar Kupa: 2001–02
 Szuperkupa: 2002

References

External links
 
 
 

1981 births
Living people
Footballers from Budapest
Hungary international footballers
Hungarian footballers
Association football defenders
Újpest FC players
FC Energie Cottbus players
RC Strasbourg Alsace players
Debreceni VSC players
Olympiacos Volos F.C. players
NEC Nijmegen players
Puskás Akadémia FC players
Nemzeti Bajnokság I players
Bundesliga players
Ligue 1 players
Ligue 2 players
Super League Greece players
Eredivisie players
Hungarian expatriate footballers
Expatriate footballers in Germany
Expatriate footballers in France
Expatriate footballers in Greece
Expatriate footballers in the Netherlands
Hungarian expatriate sportspeople in Germany
Hungarian expatriate sportspeople in France
Hungarian expatriate sportspeople in Greece
Hungarian expatriate sportspeople in the Netherlands